Bats in the belfry is a phrase that refers to being crazy or eccentric.

It may also refer to:

Film

Bats in the Belfry (1942 film), a one-shot Metro-Goldwyn-Mayer animated short
Bats in the Belfry (1960 film), a Woody Woodpecker film

Songs

"Bats in the Belfry", a song by Annihilator from their 1993 album Set the World on Fire
"Bats in the Belfry", a song by Ekoostik Hookah from their 1994 album Dubbahbuddah
"Bats in the Belfry", a song by Dispatch from their 1997 album Bang Bang
"Bats in the Belfry", a song by Overkill from their 2005 album ReliXIV
"Bats in the Belfry", a song by Nox Arcana from their 2005 album Transylvania
"Bats in the Belfry", a song by Zombie Ghost Train from their 2007 album Dealing the Death Card
”Bats in the Belfry”, a song by Jon Kennedy from his 2017 album “Ha!”
"Bats in the Belfry", a song by Qveen Herby from her 2021 album Halloqveen

Television episodes

"Bats in the Belfry", an episode of the animated TV series The Oddball Couple
"Bats in the Belfry", an episode of the TV sitcom Terry and June
"Bats in the Belfry", an episode of the animated TV series Space Goofs
"Bats in the Belfry", an episode of the animated TV series Arthur
"Bat in the Belfry", an episode of the animated TV series Teenage Mutant Ninja Turtles (2012 TV series)
"The Bat In the Belfry", an episode of the animated TV series The Batman (TV series 2004-2008)

Other
 Bats in the Belfry (1937 play)
Bats in the Belfry (video game), an Apple II game
Bats-in-the-belfry, a common name for the bellflower Campanula trachelium
Bats in the Belfry (novel), a novel by British crime author E.C.R. Lorac
Bats in the Belfry is an Achievement in the 2020 mystery puzzle-platform game Stela. As the title suggests, it is awarded after a confrontation with a swarm of bats which can kill the player on contact.

See also
Bat
Belfry (architecture)